This is a list of all the episodes of Strawberry Shortcake.

Season 1 (2003)
All the episodes in this season are single 45-minute episodes. When the episodes are broadcast on television, they are either edited to 22 minutes or are presented as a two-parter.

The intro sequence uses clips from "Meet Strawberry Shortcake", as well as the "Knock Knock, Who's There" music video.

Promotional video
A 5-minute promotional video titled "Growing Better All the Time" was released as a bonus feature with Sterling Entertainment's Care Bears: Daydreams DVD in February 2004. It appears to be produced sometime between Seasons 1-2, as the song from the promo appears on the first CD, Strawberry Jams, while scenes from the promo were used in the opening credits of the second series of the show.

Season 2 (2004–05)
Beginning with this season, 2 episodes are featured in a "compilation" format, in which Strawberry recounts the featured adventures using her "remembering book". Most TV airings, however, separate the segments as single 22-minute length episodes.

Anna Jordan replaces Sarah Koslosky as the voice as Custard the Cat.

The intro was also changed, which includes clips from "Best Pets Yet", "Play Day Surprise" and "Growing Better All the Time".

Season 3 (2006–07)
For Season 3, the show transitions off to the "A World of Friends" format that the new toyline from Playmates Toys features.

Another new intro sequence is made, featuring clips from "World of Friends".

Feature-length movie

Season 4 (2008)
Season 4 gives out a change to the artwork style. The aging of the characters was changed to make the impression that the characters had become teenagers (or for Apple Dumplin', a child). The aging of the characters was further backed by the fact that Strawberry Shortcake was seen applying for a job and later driving a car in Big Country Fun and Berry Big Journeys. 

Honey Pie and the other fillies were relegated to the role of background characters, with the character of Honey Pie Pony not having spoken since Let's Dance. She was implied to have moved to Ice Cream Island permanently in the book The Friendship Trip, which featured the Year 4 characters, logically explaining why she appeared less in the series for the season.

Daniel Canfield re-replaces James Street as Huckleberry Pie, due to the latter's death in a skateboard accident.

During this season, many of the separate 22-minute segments have aired earlier internationally than in the United States. The series was exclusively released direct-to-video in the country.

The intro sequence is changed yet again, this time featuring especially-made footage.

References

Lists of American children's animated television series episodes